The 2017–18 LEN Euro League Women was the 31st edition of the top tier European tournament for women's water polo clubs. It ran from 1 December 2017 to 21 April 2018.

Defending champions Kinef Kirishi hosted the final 4 on 20 and 21 April 2018 at their home pool. The russian team won the trophy for the second year in a row, defeating in the final game Spain's CN Sabadell.

Overview

Calendar
The calendar of the competition was released by LEN on 7 June 2017.

Participating teams

Qualification round
The draw was held by LEN on 19 August 2017.

Pools composition

Group A
Venue: Piscina Cappuccini, Messina, Italy.

Group B
Venue: Fabó Éva Sportuszoda, Dunaújváros, Hungary.

Group C
Venue: Zwembad De Krommerijn, Utrecht, Netherlands.

Group D
Venue: Centro Sportivo del Plebiscito, Padua, Italy.

‡

Preliminary round
The draw of the pools for the preliminary round was held on 6 December 2017.

Pools composition

Group E
Venue: Petros Kapagerov National Swimming Hall, Piraeus, Greece.

Group F
Venue: Piscina Francesco Scuderi, Catania, Italy.

Group G
Venue: Alfréd Hajós National Swimming Stadium, Budapest, Hungary.

Group H
Venue: Piscina Sant Jordi, Barcelona, Spain.

‡

Knockout stage

Quarterfinals
The draw of the Quarterfinals matches was held, alongside the draw for the 2019 Women's European U19 Championship, on 27 January 2018.

|}

First Leg

Second Leg

Final Four
LEN announced the choice of the defending champions Kinef Kirishi as host of the final Four on 20 March 2018. The draw was held in Pontevedra, Spain, during the last day of Europa Cup Super Final.

Semifinals

Finals
3rd place

1st place

Final standings

See also
 2017–18 LEN Champions League
 2017–18 Women's LEN Trophy

References

External links
Official LEN website
Microplustiming (Official results website)

LEN Euro League Women seasons
E
E